The canton of Charlieu is a French administrative division located in the department of Loire and the Auvergne-Rhône-Alpes region. At the French canton reorganisation which came into effect in March 2015, the canton was expanded from 14 to 31 communes:

Arcinges 
Belleroche 
Belmont-de-la-Loire 
La Bénisson-Dieu 
Boyer
Briennon 
Le Cergne 
Chandon
Charlieu
Combre 
Coutouvre 
Cuinzier 
Écoche 
La Gresle 
Jarnosse
Maizilly
Mars
Montagny 
Nandax
Pouilly-sous-Charlieu
Pradines 
Régny 
Saint-Denis-de-Cabanne
Saint-Germain-la-Montagne 
Saint-Hilaire-sous-Charlieu
Saint-Nizier-sous-Charlieu
Saint-Pierre-la-Noaille
Saint-Victor-sur-Rhins 
Sevelinges 
Villers
Vougy

See also
Cantons of the Loire department

References

Cantons of Loire (department)